Adão Joaquim Bango Cabaça best known as Tony Cabaça (born April 23, 1986) is an Angolan footballer who plays as a goalkeeper for Clube Primeiro de Agosto.

References

External links 
 

1986 births
Living people
Association football goalkeepers
Angolan footballers
Angola international footballers
C.D. Primeiro de Agosto players
Footballers from Luanda
2019 Africa Cup of Nations players